The Guides Infantry, or 2nd Battalion (Guides) The Frontier Force Regiment, is an infantry battalion of the Pakistan Army. It was raised in 1846 as part of the famous Corps of Guides.

Historical Overview
The Corps of Guides was raised at Peshawar on 14 December 1846 by Lieutenant Harry Burnett Lumsden on the orders of Sir Henry Lawrence, the British Resident at Lahore, capital of the Sikh Empire. Initially composed of a troop of cavalry and two companies of infantry mounted on camels, the Guides were organized as a highly mobile force. The corps was ordered to recruit
trustworthy men, who could, at a moment's notice, act as guides to troops in the field; men capable, too, of collecting trustworthy intelligence beyond, as well as within, our borders; and, in addition to all this, men, ready to give and take hard blows, whether on the frontier or in a wider field.
Although the corps recruited men from all over the country and even beyond the Frontier of India, Pathans, Punjabi Muslims, Sikhs and Dogras later formed the bulk of their manpower.

Harry Lumsden was chosen to train and lead the force:
He was a man of strong character, athletic, brave, resolute, cool and resourceful in emergency; a man of rare ability and natural aptitude for war, and possessed, moreover, of that magnetic influence which communicates the highest confidence and devotion to those who follow. Lumsden upheld the principle that the greatest and best school for war is war itself. He believed in the elasticity which begets individual self-confidence, and preferred a body of men taught to act and fight with personal intelligence.
 
Lumsden left a lasting imprint on the Guides, who first fought in numerous frontier operations. Believing that fighting troops were for service and not for show, Lumsden introduced loose and comfortable dust-coloured uniforms for the first time, which would soon become famous as "khaki" and within decades would be adopted by the British Army for service in India. In 1851, the Guides established themselves at Mardan, which would remain their home until 1938. 

In 1851, the Corps of Guides became part of the Punjab Irregular Force, which later became famous as the Punjab Frontier Force or Piffers. The Piffers consisted of five regiments of cavalry, eleven regiments of infantry and five batteries of artillery besides the Corps of Guides. Their mission was to maintain order on the Punjab Frontier; a task they performed efficiently during the next fifty years.

In 1876, Queen Victoria rewarded the Guides by granting them the use of the Royal Cypher and they became the Queen's Own Corps of Guides with the Prince of Wales as their Colonel. During the First World War, the cavalry and infantry of the Guides fought separately. During the war, the Guides Infantry raised three more battalions. The 3rd and 4th Guides Infantry were disbanded after the war. In 1921, the cavalry and infantry components were formally separated; the cavalry becoming the 10th Queen Victoria's Own Corps of Guides Cavalry (Frontier Force), while the infantry joined the newly formed 12th Frontier Force Regiment to make up the 5th and 10th (Queen Victoria's Own Corps of Guides) Battalions of the new infantry regiment. The 10th became the Training Battalion of the regiment. Their new class composition was one company each of Punjabi Muslims, Pathans, Sikhs and Dogras. The regiment adopted the drab uniform with red facings of the Corps of Guides. In 1943, the 10th (Training) Battalion was converted into the 12th Frontier Force Regimental Centre, while in 1945, '12' was dropped from the regiment's designation, changing it to The Frontier Force Regiment.

On the Partition of India in 1947, the Frontier Force Regiment was allotted to Pakistan. The Sikhs and Dogras were transferred to India and the new class composition of the regiment became Punjabi Muslims and Pathans in equal proportion. In 1956, the Frontier Force Rifles and Pathan Regiment were merged with the Frontier Force Regiment and all the battalions were re-numbered. At the same time, since Pakistan had become a republic, all titles pertaining to British royalty were dropped. Consequently, the Guides Infantry was redesignated as the 2nd Battalion (Guides) The Frontier Force Regiment or 2 FF (Guides).

Campaigns

Frontier Operations
The intrepid Guides quickly made a name for themselves on the North West Frontier of India in numerous operations against the turbulent frontier tribes. Between 1847 and 1878, the corps participated in fifteen major frontier expeditions and operations. Their formidable reputation soon spread far and wide, and was immortalized by Rudyard Kipling in several of his works such as The Ballad of East and West. By around the start of the 20th century, the Guides had acquired such a legendary status that when Robert Baden-Powell, the founder of Boy Scouts, decided to form a similar organization for girls in 1909, he named them Girl Guides after the Corps of Guides. How Girls Can Help to Build Up the Empire, the Girl Guides' handbook has this to say about the Corps of Guides: 
On the Indian frontier the mountain tribes are continually fighting, and our troops there are renowned for their splendid achievement and gallant conduct. The best known of all is the corps called "The Guides" … To be a Guide out there means you are one who can be relied upon for pluck, for being able to endure difficulty and danger, for being able cheerfully to take up any job that may be required, and for readiness to sacrifice yourself for others.

Second Sikh War 1848-49
Following their victory in the First Sikh War of 1845-46, the British posted a Resident at the Sikh Durbar at Lahore to control the affairs of the Sikh state. However, the Sikhs resented British interference in their affairs and began planning a revolt. Early in 1848, Lumsden and his Guides were summoned to Lahore to gather evidence of the planned Sikh insurrection - a mission that they successfully carried out. However, British counter-measures were unable to prevent the revolt, which broke out at Multan in April 1848 and soon spread to the rest of the country. The Guides served at the Siege of Multan and then participated in the Battle of Gujrat on 21 February 1849, where the Sikh Army was decisively defeated. The Second Sikh War resulted in the dissolution of the Sikh state and annexation of the Punjab by the British.

The Great Indian Mutiny of 1857
In May 1857, when the mutiny broke out, Lumsden was on a mission at Kandahar and Captain Henry Daly led the Guides to join the Delhi Field Force then besieging the ancient capital city. They left Hoti Mardan on 13 May and arrived at Delhi on 9 June after marching 580 miles in twenty-six days and fourteen hours in the searing Indian summer. 
The moral effect of the arrival of the Guides in Delhi was perhaps in some measure greater even than the actual fighting strength thus brought into line. The fame of the march from the far distant frontier, the fine physique and martial bearing of soldiers drawn from warlike tribes new to the eyes of their British comrades, ... all tended to give the approach of the travel-stained Guides a high significance. An eyewitness recorded: They came in as firm and light as if they had marched but a single mile.

The Guides went into action the same day and by evening, all of their officers were killed or wounded.  They continued to fight gallantly throughout the summer and took part in the final assault and capture of Delhi. By the time they returned home, they had suffered 350 casualties out of the 600 men who had set out in May. For their gallant conduct at Delhi, they were awarded the distinction of red piping on their tunic collars; an honour shared with the 60th Foot and the Sirmoor Rifles, who fought alongside them at Delhi.

Second Afghan War 1878-80
During the Second Afghan War of 1878-80, the Guides joined the Peshawar Field Force under General Sir Sam Browne and took part in the capture of Ali Masjid, the advance to Jalalabad and the cavalry action at Fatehabad, where Lieutenant Walter Hamilton won the Victoria Cross for gallantry. Following the Treaty of Gandamak in May 1879, the Afghan King agreed to the presence of a British Mission in Kabul. The mission, led by Sir Louis Cavagnari, arrived in Kabul on 24 July 1879, escorted by a detachment of 76 Guides under Lieutenant Hamilton, VC. However, on 3 September, a disgruntled regiment of the Afghan Army attacked the British Residency. Although the Afghans offered quarter to the Indian ranks, the Guides chose to fight to the death. The Residency finally fell after twelve hours of fierce resistance by the Guides, who perished to the last man along with 600 of their foes. The sacrifice of these gallant men is commemorated in the impressive Guides Memorial at Mardan with the following words:
The annals of no army and no regiment can show a brighter record of devoted bravery than has been achieved by this small band of Guides.
The epic stand of the Guides at Kabul Residency was immortalized by MM Kaye in her bestselling novel The Far Pavilions and in the 1984 motion picture of the same name.

The massacre at Kabul led to the resumption of hostilities and in December 1879, the Guides were dispatched to join the Kabul Field Force under General Sir Frederick Roberts at Sherpur Cantonment near Kabul. They participated in the attacks on Takht-i-Shah and Asmai Heights, where Captain Arthur Hammond won the Victoria Cross for conspicuous gallantry.

After the Second Afghan War, the Guides were involved in a number of actions along the North West Frontier including the Relief of Chitral in 1895, as part of Malakand and Buner Field Forces during the Frontier Uprising of 1897-98, and in the Mohmand Expedition of 1908. In 1906, the Corps of Guides was reorganized into separates units of cavalry and infantry within the corps.

First World War
At the outbreak of World War I, the Corps of Guides initially remained in India for service on the Frontier; both Guides Infantry and Cavalry participating in the Mohmand Blockade in 1915. In January 1917, a second battalion of Guides Infantry was raised by Captain RCG Pollock at Mardan. In October, the 3rd Guides Infantry was raised by Colonel GP Villiers Stuart, also at Mardan, while the 4th Guides Infantry was raised in October 1918 by Lieutenant ND Douglas at Nowshera. In 1917, the 1st Guides Infantry joined the 7th (Meerut) Division in Mesopotamia and fought in the action of Tikrit. In 1918, both 1st and 2nd Guides Infantry served in Palestine and took part in the Battle of Megiddo, which led to the annihilation of Turkish Army in Palestine. The 3rd Guides Infantry served in the Third Afghan War of 1919. It was disbanded in August 1921. The 4th Guides Infantry was disbanded in December 1918.

The end of the war also spelt the end of the Corps of Guides as a unit. In the post-war reorganization of the Indian Army in 1921, the corps was broken up and the cavalry and infantry became separate units, with the two battalions of Guides Infantry joining the 12th Frontier Force Regiment as its 5th and 10th Battalions.

Second World War

During the Second World War, the Guides Infantry or 5th Battalion (QVO Corps of Guides) 12th FF Regiment, served throughout in Iraq and Iran, guarding against the German threat from the north. They were not engaged in any fighting.

Indo-Pakistan War 1948
The Guides Infantry made up for its lack of action during the Second World War by giving an excellent account of itself in Kashmir in 1948. The battalion was instrumental in checking the Indian offensive in the Kishenganga Valley, where it fought with great gallantry at Tithwal and foiled all enemy efforts at advance. The Guides suffered casualties of 37 killed and 105 wounded, and were awarded eleven gallantry awards.

Indo-Pakistan War 1965
In 1965 the Guides Infantry (2FF) was camping at Kasur where A and D companies of the battalion were carrying watermanship training at Thaman Distributary near Luliani after they had moved from the Rann of Katch area. The battalion was assigned the task of establishing a bridge head on Rohhi Nullah for launching of 1 Armoured Division across the India – Pakistan border. A and D companies joined the Paltan at about 1230 hrs. The Guides moved out from the camp to cross the border. The battalion crossed the Rohi Nullah on foot and entered the enemy territory on night 6/7 Sep 1965 and established a bridge head for the armoured division. After the launching of the division, the battalion was put under 21 Bde which was part of 11th Infantry Division. On 12 September the Guides Infantry and 5 Frontier Force captured the Indian town of Khem Karan. The battalion advanced up to Bhura Khana a small village in the north of the Khem Karan. On 17 Sep 1965 it was ordered to come back and take defence positions in front of Khem Kharan. On the night 21/22 September 1965 C company position was shelled heavily and was attacked by Indian troops who succeeded in overrunning part of a forward platoon. A counter-attack was launched by C company which recovered the position. During the conflict, the Guides Infantry were awarded one Tamgha-i-Jurat and two C-in-C Commendation cards.

Rann of Kutch Conflict – April 1965.

The trouble began in March 1965 when India started interfering with Pakistan Rangers patrol in Kanger Kot area. Immediately they took a further step and laid their claim on the Kanger Kot Fort. To back it with force they started amassing troops in the Rann of Kutch. Consequently, some troops of Pakistan Army including the Guides Infantry were promptly dispatched to deal with the situation. The Guides Infantry attacked and captured the strong points of the Indian Army at Biarbet and captured the position being defended by famous Indian PARA Brigade (Guides Infantry marks 12 April as Biarbet day). An area of approx five to six miles was captured and cleared of the Indians immediately. In this small battle the battalion was awarded two Tamgha-e-Jurat, Four Imtiazi Sanads and one C-in-C Commendation Card.

Honours

Tamgh-e-Jurat
 Lance Havildar Khaki Jan
 Naik Atta Khan

Imtiazi Sanad
 Lt Col Muhammad Iqbal Khan ( Later General)
 Captain Bilal Ahmed ( Later Maj General)
 Captain S J Babar ( Later Chief Commissioner Peshawar)
 Sepoy Din Bad Shah

Commendation Card
 Subedar Ali Asghar 
 Havildar Muhammad Razak Khan
 Sepoy Noor Jamal

Indo-Pakistani War of 1971

On 3 October 1971 during the war, the battalion was deployed to the Chakothi area to defend the Sirinager-to-Muzaffarabad road in the Uri section. C Company was sent to defend the Lipa valley, joined by elements of the Tochi Scouts. Lipa was defended under second-in-command Abdul Hamid Afridi. On 8 November, Indian forces attacked two patrols of C Company at Shisha Ladi with the intent of capturing the Lipa valley. The final attack was repulsed at 04:15. At 08:00 the second attack began with heavy artillery fire, incurring many casualties by 10:30. Major Aziz Ahmed, Samandar Shah and three jawans held Shahadat. Members of the battalion received a Sitara-e-Jurat, a Tamgha-i-Jurat and an Imtiazi Sanad. (This entire description needs re-visiting. 2 FF was deployed in Chakothi sector, with battalion HQ at Chakothi, a company deployed on Sugna-Ziarat ridge, A company at Parat and another company which repulsed the Indian infiltration of Ziarat ridge under the command of Captain Gulzar Ahmed Wazir. The fourth company under Major Aziz Ahmed was detached to Lipa Valley where it fought a glorious action on Shisha Ladi ridge, "R" battery of 25 Composite Mountain Regiment (Artillery) was in support. It was commanded by Lt Col Abdul Hameed Khan in 1971.)

Awards
 Sitara-e-Jurat:  Major Aziz Ahmed. He embraced shahdat near Zairat post in Khalana valley. A post is named after him in this area, titled as 'Aziz Post'.
 Tamgha-e-Jurrat: Naib Subedar Muhammad Bashir
 Commendation Card: Jumma Khan

Battle Honours
Mooltan, Goojerat, Punjaub, Delhi 1857, Ali Masjid, Kabul 1879, Afghanistan 1878-80, Chitral, Punjab Frontier, Malakand, Mesopotamia 1917-18, Megiddo, Sharon, Palestine 1918, NW Frontier, India 1914-15, Afghanistan 1919, Kashmir 1948, Rann of Kutch 1965, Khem Karan 1965.

Victoria Cross Recipients

 Lieutenant RH Shebbeare, Delhi, 14 September 1857
 Lieutenant WRP Hamilton, Fatehabad, Afghanistan, 2 April 1879
 Captain AG Hammond, Asmai Heights, Afghanistan, 14 December 1879
 Major RB Adams, Landakai, Swat, 17 August 1897
 Lieutenant HLS Maclean, Landakai, Swat, 17 August 1897
 Captain GMC Meynell, Mohmand, North West Frontier, 29 September 1935

Changes in Title
 1846 The Corps of Guides
 1851 The Corps of Guides, Punjab Irregular Force
 1865 Corps of Guides, Punjab Frontier Force
 1876 Queen's Own Corps of Guides, Punjab Frontier Force
 1901 Queen's Own Corps of Guides
 1904 Queen's Own Corps of Guides (Lumsden's)
 1906 Queen Victoria's Own Corps of Guides (Frontier Force) (Lumsden's) Infantry
 1917 1st Battalion Queen Victoria's Own Corps of Guides (Frontier Force) (Lumsden’s) Infantry
 1922 5th Battalion (Queen Victoria's Own Corps of Guides) 12th Frontier Force Regiment
 1945 5th Battalion (Queen Victoria's Own Corps of Guides) The Frontier Force Regiment
 1956 2nd Battalion (Guides) The Frontier Force Regiment

Affiliations & Alliances
  The Guides Cavalry
  The Royal Green Jackets

References and Notes
http://www.radio.gov.pk/03-04-2019/pakistan-army-approves-promotion-of-40-brigadiers-to-major-general

Further reading
 Younghusband, Col GJ. (1908). The Story of the Guides. London: MacMillan & Co.
 The History of the Guides 1846-1922. Vol I. (1938). Aldershot: Gale and Polden.
 MacMunn, Lt Gen Sir George. (1950). The History of the Guides 1922-1947. Vol II. Aldershot: Gale and Polden.
 Khan, Maj Gen Fazal Muqeem. (1996). History of the 2nd Battalion (Guides) Frontier Force Regiment 1947-1994. Rawalpindi: The Army Press.
 Condon, Brig WEH. (1962). The Frontier Force Regiment. Aldershot: Gale & Polden.
 Attiqur Rahman, Lt Gen M. (1980). The Wardens of the Marches – A History of the Piffers 1947-71. Lahore: Wajidalis.
 Dey, RSBN. (1905). A Brief Account of the Late Punjab Frontier Force, From its Organization in 1849 to its Re-distribution on 31st March 1903. Calcutta.
 North, REFG. (1934). The Punjab Frontier Force: A Brief Record of Their Services 1846-1924. Dera Ismail Khan: Commercial Steam Press, HQ Waziristan District.
 Hayauddin, Maj Gen M. (1950). One Hundred Glorious Years: A History of the Punjab Frontier Force, 1849-1949. Lahore: Civil and Military Gazette Press.
 Khan, Maj Muhammad Nawaz. (1996). The Glorious Piffers 1843-1995. Abbottabad: The Frontier Force Regimental Centre.
 Lumsden, Gen. Sir Peter, and Elsmie, G. R. (1900). Lumsden of the Guides: A Sketch of the Life of Lieutenant General Sir Harry Burnett Lumsden, KCSI, CB, with Selections from His Correspondence and Occasional Papers. London: J Murray.
 Daly, Maj Hugh. (1905). Memoirs of General Sir Henry Dermot Daly, GCB, CIE. London: J Murray.
 Gaylor, John. (1991). Sons of John Company: The Indian and Pakistan Armies 1903- 1991. Stroud: Spellmount Publishers Ltd. 
 Elliott, Maj Gen JG. (1968). The Frontier 1839-1947: The Story of the North-West Frontier of India. London: Cassell.
 Ahmed, Lt Gen Mahmud. (2006). History of Indo-Pak War – 1965. Rawalpindi: Services Book Club.

External links
The Story of the Guides by GJ Younghusband
Queen's Own Corps of Guides (Punjab Frontier Force) at The British Empire
Lieutenant General Sir Harry Burnett Lumsden, KCSI, CB. Obituary in The Times, 13 August 1895
Article discussing the raising of the Corps of Guides by Harry Lumsden
General Sir Henry Dermot Daly

British Indian Army regiments
British Indian Army infantry regiments
Honourable East India Company regiments
Indian World War I regiments
Indian World War II regiments
Military units and formations established in 1846
Frontier Force Regiment
1846 establishments in British India